Sigurd Kielland Brandt (19 May 1886 – 21 May 1964) was a Danish painter. His work was part of the painting event in the art competition at the 1924 Summer Olympics.

References

1886 births
1964 deaths
19th-century Danish painters
20th-century Danish painters
Danish male painters
Olympic competitors in art competitions
People from Guldborgsund Municipality
19th-century Danish male artists
20th-century Danish male artists